The men's boulder competition in sport climbing at the 2022 World Games took place on 15 July 2022 at the Sloss Furnaces in Birmingham, United States.

Results

Qualification

Final

References 

Men's boulder